The De Hoed Mill is a post mill in Waarde, Netherlands. The structure was originally built as an oil mill in the town of Ghent in 1550, and was converted to a corn mill in the late 17th century. The mill was moved to its current location in 1989. 

The windmill is listed as a protected structure under rijksmonument number 32419.

References 

Windmills completed in 1989
Post mills in the Netherlands
Windmills in Zeeland
Rijksmonuments in Zeeland
Buildings and structures in Reimerswaal